Mladen Srbinović (Sušica near Gostivar, 29 November 1925 — Belgrade, 12 May 2009) was a Serbian painter, member of the Arts and Sciences academies of Serbia and Macedonia and professor of Belgrade University.

Biography  
Mladen Srbinović was born in 1925 in the village of Sušica near Gostivar in a local Serb family. Srbinovićs moved to Belgrade in 1930 where Mladen finished primary school and high school. He continued his studies at the Art Academy (1947–51) finishing his post-graduate studies in 1953. In the same year he became assistant professor at the Academy, later on becoming a professor and teaching until 1988.

His first exhibited his paintings in 1948 and had a solo exhibition in 1952. Later in his career he represented Yugoslavia on many exhibitions abroad. He is one of the founders of the "December Group" (1955). He published two  "graphic maps" inspired by the verses of Lorka. Parallel with his painting and graphic art from 1960 Srbinović started working on mosaics and tapestries which predominated in the later part of his life. During his career he won many prestigious awards including Oktobarska nagrada (twice, 1958 and 1974) and Sedmojulska nagrada (1984).

In 1980s Srbinović got engaged in politics. He was one of the members of the Committee for the Defense of Freedom of Thought and Expression created by writer Dobrica Ćosić in 1984. Srbinović was also among the founders of the Democratic Party (although he left it soon afterwards) and a member of a crown council of prince Aleksandar of Serbia. In the period in which the regime of Slobodan Milošević was in power (1989-2000), he denounced all official awards.

Works  
His famous mosaics adorn Palace "Serbia" in Belgrade (1962), Town Museum of Sarajevo (1966), Municipal Council in Kruševac (1971 and 1988), medical center in Gamzigradska Banja spa (1975), Church of St Nicholas in Ruma (1985), Investbanka in Belgrade (1989), Monastery of Žiča (1993) etc. He also made stained glass windows of the grand hall of the Serbian Academy of Sciences and Arts.

References 

 Preminuo Mladen Srbinović, Politika 13 May 2009 http://www.politika.rs/rubrike/Kultura/Preminuo-Mladen-Srbinovic.lt.html
 http://www.galerijamamuzic.org.rs/index.php/autori/8-autori/31-mladen-srbinovic

1925 births
2009 deaths
People from Gostivar Municipality
Members of the Serbian Academy of Sciences and Arts
20th-century Serbian painters
Burials at Belgrade New Cemetery
Serbian male painters
20th-century Serbian male artists